Lapeirousia jacquinii is a species of flowering plant in the genus Lapeirousia. It is endemic to the Northern Cape and Western Cape of South Africa.

Distribution 
Lapeirousia jacquinii is found from Cape Town and Worcester in the Western Cape, northwards to Garies and Nieuwoudtville in the Northern Cape. It is usually found in sandy soil on mountains and in river valleys.

Conservation status 
Lapeirousia jacquinii is classified as Least Concern with a stable population.

References

External links 
 
 

Endemic flora of South Africa
Flora of South Africa
Flora of the Cape Provinces
Iridaceae
Taxa named by N. E. Brown